E Bolaji Idowu (1913–1995 was the third native-born leader of the Methodist Church Nigeria, serving from 1972 to 1984. He is also well known for his ethnographic and theological studies of the Yoruba people.

Life

Idowu was born on 28 September 1913, in Ikorodu, Lagos State, Nigeria. His early education was at the Anglican and Methodist schools in Ikorodu. There, he met the Rev. A. T. Ola Olude and was converted to Christianity. After finishing at Wesley College in Ibadan, he became headmaster at the primary school in Remo, Ogun State. He was ordained in 1942.

From 1945 to 1948, he continued his studies at Wesley House, Cambridge. From 1957 to 1958, he was posted in Germany in an effort to resolve some of the problems that were facing African and Asian students there. In 1958 he joined the staff of the Department of Religious Studies at the University of Ibadan and served as its head from 1963 to 1976.

Church leader
In 1972, he was elected president of the Methodist Church Nigeria. He immediately initiated a reform of the church's constitution, emphasizing the need for autonomy and indigenization. The new constitution was ratified in 1976, whereupon Idowu became the church's patriarch. Church members held him in such high esteem that items he had touched during his services were believed to have healing powers. He retired in 1984 and died in 1993. A cathedral in Ikorodu was named in his honor.

Ethnotheology
In the process of preparing a doctoral thesis for the University of London (in 1955), Idowu discovered that all the available material on African religion appeared to be inaccurate, condescending or simply ridiculous. (For example: Leo Frobenius's belief that the Yoruba religion came from Plato's Atlantis by way of Egypt.) As a result, he set out to describe the religious beliefs of his own Yoruba people according to universal theological concerns such as the nature of the Deity, morality, and the ultimate destiny of mankind. His writings on the subject are among the first examples of African religion seen from the viewpoint of an African, but it is not a traditional religious, and the result is biased by Christianity, distancing the reader from real orthodox tribal customs and practices. .

Publications
 Olódùmarè : God in Yoruba Belief, New York, N.Y., Wazobia (1994) 
  African Traditional Religion: a Definition, Maryknoll, N.Y., Orbis Books (1973) 
 Olódùmarè : God in Yoruba Belief, Ikeja : Longman Nigeria (1982) 
 Towards an Indigenous Church, London, Oxford University Press (1965)
 Obituary: God’s or Man’s,” an inaugural lecture delivered at the University of Ibadan on Thursday, October 24, (1974).

See also
 Yoruba religion

References

People from Lagos
Yoruba Christian clergy
Academic staff of the University of Ibadan
1913 births
1993 deaths
Nigerian Methodists
Alumni of the University of London
20th-century Nigerian people
Alumni of Wesley House
Residents of Lagos